Grodner Sztyme ('Grodno Voice') was a Yiddish-language weekly newspaper in interbellum Poland, published from Grodno (in present-day Belarus). Grodner Sztyme was an organ of the General Jewish Labour Bund in Poland. It was published 1927-1939. A total of 205 issues were published. Mosze Rubinsztejn was the editor and publisher of Grodner Sztyme 1927-1935, followed by I. Lewi. It was printed by M. Mejłachowicz.

On October 5, 1939 Berl Abramovitz (one of the editors of Grodner Sztyme) was arrested.

References

Defunct newspapers published in Poland
Jews and Judaism in Grodno
General Jewish Labour Bund in Poland
Mass media in Grodno
Weekly newspapers published in Poland
Yiddish-language mass media in Poland
Yiddish socialist newspapers